Shelby County High School may refer to:

 Shelby County High School (Alabama), United States
 Shelby County High School (Kentucky), United States